This is an episode listing for the comedy drama TV series Ugly Betty.  The show premiered on September 28, 2006 on ABC in the United States and ended its run on April 14, 2010 after 85 episodes.

Series overview

Episodes

Season 1 (2006–07)

Season 2 (2007–08)

Season 3 (2008–09)

Season 4 (2009–10)

Mode After Hours episodes

Season 1

Season 2

Season 2 includes 6 episodes but an exclusive 7th episode was subsequently added.

Season 3

References

 01
Lists of American comedy-drama television series episodes